Mike Sposa (born June 5, 1969) is an American professional golfer.

Sposa was born in Teaneck, New Jersey. He played college golf at the University of Tennessee where he was an All-American in 1990 and 1991 and won the SEC Championship in 1990. He played on the 1991 Walker Cup team where he teamed with David Duval for a pair of wins in foursomes.

Sposa played on the Nationwide Tour and PGA Tour from 1994 to 2007. On the Nationwide Tour, 1994–96, 1998, 2004–05, and 2007, his best finish was a win at the 1998 Nike Boise Open. On the PGA Tour, 1999–2003 and 2006, his best finish was T-4 at the 2002 Compaq Classic of New Orleans.

Professional wins (1)

Nike Tour wins (1)

Nike Tour playoff record (0–1)

Results in major championships

CUT = missed the halfway cut
Note: Sposa only played in the U.S. Open

Results in The Players Championship

CUT = missed the halfway cut

U.S. national team appearances
Amateur
Walker Cup: 1991 (winners)

See also
1998 Nike Tour graduates
2000 PGA Tour Qualifying School graduates
2005 PGA Tour Qualifying School graduates

References

External links

American male golfers
Tennessee Volunteers men's golfers
PGA Tour golfers
Korn Ferry Tour graduates
Golfers from New Jersey
Golfers from Tampa, Florida
People from Teaneck, New Jersey
1969 births
Living people